The Shandin Hills are a low mountain range of the Transverse Ranges system of Southern California.

Geography
The hills are located within the City of San Bernardino, in southern San Bernardino County.

The Shandin Hills are separate and south of the San Bernardino Mountains foothills, and not as high in elevation.

I-215 passes through the mountain range via the Shandin Pass, connecting not only the University District and Downtown San Bernardino, but also the South and North San Bernardino Districts.

References 

Mountain ranges of San Bernardino County, California
Transverse Ranges
San Bernardino, California
San Bernardino Mountains
Hills of California
Mountain ranges of Southern California